Stylochaeton is a genus of flowering plants in the family Araceae that is endemic to Africa. Stylochaeton are rhizomatous with hastate leaves. Flowering in this genus is said to be quite uncommon. Stylochaeton is the sole genus in the tribe Stylochaetoneae.

Species
Stylochaeton angolense Engl. - Angola
Stylochaeton bogneri Mayo - Kenya, Tanzania
Stylochaeton borumense N.E.Br. - Kenya, Tanzania, Mozambique, Zambia
Stylochaeton crassispathum Bogner - Tanzania
Stylochaeton cuculliferum Peter - Zaïre, Tanzania, Zambia, Malawi
Stylochaeton euryphyllum Mildbr. - Tanzania, Mozambique
Stylochaeton grande N.E.Br. - Somalia
Stylochaeton hypogeum Lepr. - Benin, Burkina Faso, Ivory Coast, Mauritania, Senegal, Nigeria, Chad, Ethiopia, Sudan 
Stylochaeton kornasii Malaisse & Bamps  - Zaïre
Stylochaeton lancifolium Kotschy & Peyr. - Benin, Burkina Faso, Guinea, Ivory Coast, Mali, Nigeria, Niger, Senegal, Togo, Cameroon, Central African Republic, Chad, Sudan 
Stylochaeton malaissei Bogner - Zaïre
Stylochaeton milneanum Mayo - Tanzania
Stylochaeton natalense Schott - Tanzania, Malawi, Mozambique, Zimbabwe, Eswatini, northern South Africa
Stylochaeton oligocarpum Riedl. - Ogaden region of eastern Ethiopia
Stylochaeton pilosum Bogner - Sierra Leone
Stylochaeton puberulum N.E.Br.  - Kenya, Tanzania, Mozambique, Zambia, Zimbabwe
Stylochaeton salaamicum N.E.Br. - Kenya, Tanzania
Stylochaeton shabaense Malaisse & Bamps - Zaïre
Stylochaeton tortispathum Bogner & Haigh - Mozambique
Stylochaeton zenkeri Engl - Zaïre, Congo-Brazzaville, Equatorial Guinea, Cameroon, Sierra Leone

References

External links

Aroideae
Araceae genera
Flora of Africa